Hewanam Arachchige Maduri Samuddika (born 8 November 1984), known as Maduri Samuddika, is a Sri Lankan cricketer.

References

1984 births
Living people
Sri Lankan women cricketers
Sri Lanka women One Day International cricketers
Sri Lanka women Twenty20 International cricketers
Cricketers from Colombo
Asian Games medalists in cricket
Cricketers at the 2014 Asian Games
Asian Games bronze medalists for Sri Lanka
Medalists at the 2014 Asian Games